Kwoinlo is a small village in South Sudan. It lies in Upper Nile state, northwest of Fangak.

References

Populated places in Upper Nile (state)